The Toyota Tundra 225 was the 9th stock car race of the 2021 NASCAR Camping World Truck Series season, and the inaugural running of the event. The race was held on Saturday, May 22, 2021 in Austin, Texas at the Circuit of the Americas. The race took 41 laps to complete. At the end, Todd Gilliland of Front Row Motorsports would win the race, the second of his career and his first of the year. Kaz Grala of Young's Motorsports and Tyler Ankrum of GMS Racing would fill in the rest of the podium positions, finishing 2nd and 3rd respectively.

Background 

Circuit of the Americas (COTA) is a grade 1 FIA-specification motorsports facility located within the extraterritorial jurisdiction of Austin, Texas. It features a 3.426-mile (5.514 km) road racing circuit. The facility is home to the Formula One United States Grand Prix, and the Motorcycle Grand Prix of the Americas, a round of the FIM Road Racing World Championship. It previously hosted the Supercars Championship, the FIA World Endurance Championship, the IMSA SportsCar Championship, and IndyCar Series.

On September 30, 2020, it was announced that COTA would host a NASCAR Cup Series event for the first time on May 23, 2021. The lower Xfinity and Camping World Truck Series were also added as support events. On December 11, 2020, it was announced that NASCAR would run the full 3.41 mile course.

Entry list 

*Withdrew due to a stolen truck.

Practice 
The first and final practice took place on Friday, May 21 at 4:05 PM EST.

One incident would happen during practice: Brad Gross would spin with 26 minutes left in practice. Gross would receive damage from the spin and would not set a lap time.

Qualifying 
Qualifying would take place under torrential downpour on Saturday, May 22 at 10:06 AM EST. Qualifying consisted of two rounds- the first round would be 25 minutes long, and everyone would have a chance to set a lap time. Then, the fastest 12 qualifiers would move on to the second round- a 10 minute round in which whoever set the fastest time in Round 2 won the pole.

Logan Bearden, Dawson Cram, Spencer Boyd, Samuel LeComte, John Atwell, Brad Gross, and Jennifer Jo Cobb would all fail to make the event. 

There were numerous incidents in qualifying. First, Chase Purdy and Derek Kraus would crash into each other, sending Kraus spinning. Cobb would crash in qualifying in Turn 13, causing substantial damage to her vehicle. Samuel LeComte would spin after going wide exiting turn 20, hitting the curbs and spinning. Cory Roper would spin in Turn 11 after also going wide. Finally, Kraus was involved with another incident, this time with Roger Reuse.

Race

Pre-race comments and ceremonies

Race recap

Post-race driver comments

Race results 
Stage 1 Laps: 12

Stage 2 Laps: 14

Stage 3 Laps: 15

References 

2021 NASCAR Camping World Truck Series
NASCAR races at Circuit of the Americas
Toyota Tundra 225
Toyota Tundra 225